1,2-Bis(dichlorophosphino)benzene is an organophosphorus compound with the formula C6H4(PCl2)2.  A viscous colorless liquid, it is a precursor to chelating diphosphines of the type C6H4(PR2)2.
It is prepared from 1,2-dibromobenzene by sequential lithiation followed by treatment with (Et2N)2PCl (Et = ethyl), which affords C6H4[P(NEt2)2]2.  This species is finally cleaved with hydrogen chloride:
C6H4[P(NEt2)2]2  +  8 HCl  →   C6H4(PCl2)2  +  4 Et2NH2Cl

Related compounds
1,2-Bis(dichlorophosphino)ethane

References

Phosphines